Platyptilia fulva is a moth of the family Pterophoridae. It is known from La Réunion, Madagascar and Mauritius.

The larvae feed on Cosmos species and Emilia citrina.

References

fulva
Moths of Madagascar
Moths of Mauritius
Moths of Réunion
Moths described in 1964